The  New York Giants season was the franchise's 3rd season in the National Football League, and first under head coach Earl Potteiger. The Giants suffered their only loss and sole tie to the Cleveland Bulldogs.  They were ranked first in yards allowed, yards gained, and points allowed, and were second in points scored. Over the entire season, the Giants scored 197 points and allowed 20. The team was led in scoring by fullback Jack McBride who scored 57 points, with six rushing touchdowns, two field goals, and 15 extra points. They then lost an exhibition game on December 26, 1927, in Oklahoma to Otto and Ira Hamilton's Hominy Indians (all Native American team), 13–6 (Documentary: Playground of the Native Son).

Schedule

Game Summaries

Week 2: at Providence Steam Roller

Week 3: at Cleveland Bulldogs

Week 4: at Pottsville Maroons

Week 5: vs. Cleveland Bulldogs

Week 6 (Game 1): at Frankford Yellow Jackets

Week 6 (Game 2): vs. Frankford Yellow Jackets

Week 7: vs. Pottsville Maroons

Week 8: vs. Duluth Eskimos

Week 9: vs. Providence Steam Roller

Week 10: vs. Chicago Cardinals

Week 11: vs. Chicago Bears

Week 12: vs. New York Yankees

Week 13: at New York Yankees

Standings

See also
List of New York Giants seasons

External links
1927 New York Giants season at Pro Football Reference

New York Giants seasons
New York Giants
National Football League championship seasons
New York
1920s in Manhattan
Washington Heights, Manhattan